A. Surya Prakash is an Indian journalist who was also the chairperson of Prasar Bharati.

He has served as chief of bureau of Indian Express, executive editor of The Pioneer, India editor of Asia Times, political editor of Eenadu Group and editor of Zee News. He is the author of two books, What Ails Indian Parliament and The Emergency — Indian Democracy’s Darkest Hour. Prakash has an MA in sociology from Mysore University and D.Litt. from Tumkur University. He was appointed as a member of a search panel to choose an anti-corruption ombudsman called Lokpal.

References

Indian editors
Living people
University of Mysore alumni
Recipients of the Rajyotsava Award 2010
Year of birth missing (living people)